Eunoe yedoensis is a scale worm described from off Japan in the North Pacific Ocean at a depth of 641 m.

Description
Number of segments 41; elytra 15 pairs. No distinct pigmentation pattern. Prostomium anterior margin comprising a pair of acute anterior projections. Lateral antennae inserted ventrally (beneath Prostomium and median antenna). elytra marginal fringe of papillae present. Notochaetae distinctly thicker than neurochaetae. Bidentate neurochaetae absent.

References

Phyllodocida
Animals described in 1885